Nevra Serezli (born 9 August 1944) is a Turkish film, stage, television and voice actress. Following her graduation from Robert College, she went on to study theatre. In 1965, she started working as a professional stage actress at the Dormen Theatre. Two years later, she appeared at the Ankara Art Theatre. Between 1971 and 1978, she performed in numerous plays with Altan Erbulak and Metin Serezli. In 1984, she registered with Devekuşu Kabare Tiyatrosu (Ostrich Cabaret Theatre) as an actress. She served at the Devekuşu Kabare until 1989. After reprising her duties at the Dormen Theatre in 1990, she joined the theatrical assembly called Tiyatro İstanbul. She gave lessons at the Language and Culture Centre (LCC).

Whilst a student at American College for Girls, she was spotted by college coaches with her role in the musical My Fair Lady. She took lessons from Müşfik Kenter, Melih Cevdet, Haldun Taner and Haldun Dormen. At the age of 22, she played in Cengiz Han'ın Bisikleti at the Dormen Theatre. She participated in theatre festivals in Italy and England.

Nevra Serezli's first film appearance was in the 1966 film Kara Tren and she went on to appear in the comedy films Ne Olacak Şimdi? (1979), Zübük (1980), Kılıbık (1983), Atla Gel Şaban (1984), Aşık Oldum (1985) and Şendul Şaban (1985).

She provided the Turkish voice of a character in the U.S. film Of Mice and Men. She has also starred in the films Unutulmayanlar (2006) and Senin Hikâyen (2013), amongst others. In 2015, she was cast as Peyker in Şebnem Burcuoğlu's adaptation of Kocan Kadar Konuş (2015).

Serezli's television work includes appearances in Ahududu (1974), Kavanozdaki Adam (1987), Sonradan Görmeler (1994–1996), Yerim Seni (1997), Vay Anam Vay (2001), Anne Babamla Evlensene (2005), Sevgili Dünürüm (2007), Altın Kızlar (2009), Başrolde Aşk (2011), Salih Kuşu (2013), Bebek İşi (2013) and Diğer Yarım (2014) before starring as Süreyya Üstün in the  Star TV series Gönül İşleri in 2015.

She portrayed Dudu for five seasons in the Turkish television series Sihirli Annem from 2003 to 2011.

Nevra Serezli was married to the prominent actor Metin Serezli from 1968 until his death in 2013. Their son, Murat Serezli, is also an actor in Turkey.

Early life and marriage
Nevra Serezli was born in 1944, in Ankara, Turkey. Her father, Mehmet Abdülkadir Süreyya Şirvan, was a businessman. Her paternal grandfather was from Shirvan, Azerbaijan. Her mother, Ulya Şirvan, was an ethnic Circassian. Before she turned one year old, her parents moved from Ankara to the yalı of her mother's family in Bebek, Istanbul. Nevra Serezli spent a vast majority of her childhood in Istanbul where she attended the American College for Girls. She lived in the neighbourhoods of Bebek, Arnavutköy, Teşvikiye and Kavacık, respectively. Nevra Serezli has a younger sister.

On 7 March 1968, she married the eminent actor and director Metin Serezli, whom she had met in 1966 and got engaged to in 1967. The couple had two sons, Murat and Selim, and two grandchildren. Metin Serezli died of lung cancer on 10 March 2013. He was buried at the Zincirlikuyu Cemetery following a religious funeral held at the Teşvikiye Mosque two days later.

Stage career
Nevra Serezli's stage work includes appearances in Pierre Barillet and Jean-Pierre Gredy's Çetin Ceviz (1996–1996; Tiyatro İstanbul) and Acaba Hangisi (1988–1999; Tiyatro İstanbul), Refik Erduran's Cengiz Han'ın Bisikleti (Dormen Theatre), Turgut Özakman's Paramparça (Dormen Theatre) and Deliler (1984–1989, Devekuşu Kabare Tiyatrosu), Richard Alfieri's Six Dance Lessons in Six Weeks (Tiyatro İstanbul), A. R. Gurney's Sylvia (1999–2000; Tiyatro İstanbul), Jacques Deval's Tovaritch (Şahane Züğürtler), Lerner and Loewe's My Fair Lady, Aşk Münir Özkul Theatre, Hisseli Harikalar Kumpanyası (Şan Tiyatrosu), Işıklar Neden Karardı? (Çevre Tiyatrosu), Çılgın Sonbahar, Çıplak Ayaklı Kontes (Dormen Theatre), Durdurun Dünyayı İnecek Var, Geceye Selam, Gönül Hırsızı (Tiyatro İstanbul), Olur Böyle Vakalar (Çevre Tiyatrosu), Sait Hop Sait, Şen Sazın Bülbülleri and Yolun Yarısı (1990).

Filmography

Film

Television

References

External links
 

1944 births
Living people
Turkish film actresses
Turkish television actresses
Turkish people of Circassian descent
People from Ankara
Actresses from Istanbul